The Shire of Perenjori is a local government area in the Mid West region of Western Australia, about  north of the state capital, Perth.

History

The Shire of Perenjori originated as the Perenjori Road District, established on 27 April 1928 when the Perenjori-Morawa Road District (which had separated from the Upper Irwin Road District in 1916), split into separate Perenjori and Morawa road districts.

On 1 July 1961, Perenjori became a shire following the passage of the Local Government Act 1960, which reformed all remaining road districts into shires.

On 18 September 2009, the Shires of Mingenew, Three Springs, Morawa and Perenjori announced their intention to amalgamate. A formal agreement was signed five days later, and the name Billeranga was later chosen. However, by February 2011, community pressure had led to the negotiations stalling, and on 16 April 2011, voters from the Shire of Perenjori defeated the proposal at a referendum.

Wards
The Shire is divided into five wards:

 Perenjori Ward (three councillors)
 Caron Ward (one councillor)
 Latham/Caron Ward (two councillors)
 Bowgada Ward (two councillors)
 Maya Ward (1 councillor)

Towns and localities
The towns and localities of the Shire of Perenjori with population and size figures based on the most recent Australian census:

Population

Heritage-listed places

As of 2023, 47 places are heritage-listed in the Shire of Perenjori, of which three are on the State Register of Heritage Places.

References

External links
 
 Perenjori Cemetery

Perenjori